The 1960 All-Ireland Football Championship was the 74th staging of the All-Ireland Senior Football Championship, the Gaelic Athletic Association's premier inter-county Gaelic football tournament. The championship began on 1 May 1960 and ended on 25 September 1960.

Fermanagh back in the Ulster championship for the first time since 1948.

Kerry entered the championship as the defending champions.

On 25 September 1960, Down won the championship following a 2–10 to 0–8 defeat of Kerry in the All-Ireland final. This was their first All-Ireland title.

Down's James McCartan Sr. was the choice for Texaco Footballer of the Year.

Results

Connacht Senior Football Championship

Quarter-final

Semi-finals

Final

Leinster Senior Football Championship        
	
First round

Quarter-finals

Semi-finals

Final

Munster Senior Football Championship

Quarter-final

Semi-finals

Final

Ulster Senior Football Championship

Preliminary round

Quarter-finals

Semi-finals

Final

All-Ireland Senior Football Championship

Semi-finals

Final

Championship statistics

Miscellaneous

 Kildare played Westmeath in the Leinster football championship for the first time since 1931.
 Fermanagh back in the Ulster football championship for the first time since 1948.
 The Dublin vs Longford game set a new record for highest score in senior football championship history (60pts). It has been equalled in 1979 (Kerry v Clare) & 2015 (Mayo v Sligo). 
 Waterford beat Cork for the first time since 1919.
 Offaly win their first Leinster title.
 Down win their first All Ireland title and become the second team from Ulster after Cavan back in 1933 to win the All Ireland and the first from Northern Ireland.
 The attendance of 87,768 at the All-Ireland final between Down and Kerry sets a new official record.

Scorers
Overall

Single game

References